Sakti is a city and a district in the state of Chhattisgarh.  The assembly constituency number of District Sakti is 33, Earlier it was the only Education District of Chhattisgarh.  There are 245 panchayats and 458 villages under Sakti district.  Sakti district was formed on 15 August 2021 And came into complete district existence on 9 September 2022 by Chief Minister Bhupesh Baghel.  The current 2018 - 2023 MLA here is Shri Charan Das Mahant , who is the Speaker of the Chhattisgarh Legislative assembly.
The First Collector and District Magistrate of Sakti is Nupur Rashi Panna I.A.S, First Superintendent of Police is M.R. Ahire I.P.S and First District Education Officer is B.L. Khare, who was also the last District Education Officer of Education District Sakti.

Geography
It has an average elevation of 237 metres (777 feet).

Sakti is a hill station situated on the banks of Borai river and foothills of Udaigiri Mountain range of Chhattisgarh. It gets its name from age old temple of Maa Mahamaya in the Heart of Sakti. Town comes in the drainage system of Mand river, The Mand river originates from the Mand mountain range. Surrounded by hills from Northern Direction, it has beautiful waterfalls and famous tourist places around like Damau which has Ancient hand written scripts on walls of its cave with a perennial waterfall, Rainkhol which is a forest cut area, The Chandrahasini Sakti Peath and The Adbhar Aastbhuji Maa Sakti Peath which is an archaeological site. Main flora is Sal, Mahua and fauna is the Indian Bear, Hyena. Soil is found to be rich in Iron, with some traces of Pitchblende

Sakti district is surrounded by Korba district in the North-West, Janjgir-Champa District in the West, Raigarh district in the East, Sarangarh district in the South.

History
During the British Raj era, Sakti was the capital of Sakti State, one of several princely states of the Eastern States Agency.

The rulers of this princely state bore the title of 'Rana'.

 .... – .... Rudra Singh
 .... – .... Udai Singh
 .... – .... Kiwat Singh
 .... – .... Kagan Singh
 .... – 1837 Kalandar Singh
 1837–19 Jun 1850 Vacant
 19 Jun 1850 – 1875 Ranjit Singh (b. 1836 – d. ....)

 1875 – Feb 1892 Vacant
 Feb 1892 – Jul 1914 Rup Narayan Singh
 4 July 1914 – 15 August 1947 Liladhar Singh (b. 1892 – d. 19..)
His Son Raja Surendra Bahadur Singh, represented India in its hockey team and was twice a minister for the government of the State of Madhya Pradesh. 
On 15 August 2021, by Chief Minister of Chhattisgarh, Sakti was announced as new district of Chhattisgarh alongside Mohla Manpur, Sarangarh-Bilaigarh & Manendragarh. Raising the total number of districts in Chhattisgarh to 33.

Climate
Sakti has a tropical wet and dry climate. Temperatures remain moderate through most of the year, though not from March to June, which can be extremely hot. The temperature in April–May sometimes rises above 44 °C. These summer months also have dry and hot winds. The city receives about 1,300 millimeters (51 in) of rain, mostly in the monsoon season from late June to early October. Winters last from November to January and are mild, although lowest temperature can fall up to 5 °C (41 °F).
The entire area including Sakti is passing through a severe shortage of drinking water. Groundwater is hard and resources are limited. If the problem of drinking water is not met timely, the entire terrain may be converted into the desert in the years to come.

Demographics
The Sakti city is divided into 18 wards for which elections are held every 5 years. The Sakti Municipality has population of 21,955 of which 11,111 are males while 10,844 are females as per report released by Census India 2011. It has approximately 94% agricultural land which is highest in state. Sakti metropolitan area population is more than 1 lakh, making it largest city of the District.

Transport

Sakti has a Railway Station on the Tatanagar–Bilaspur section of Howrah-Nagpur-Mumbai line. Major trains stop here including Mumbai-Howrah Mail since beginning. It is also connected through National Highway No.200.
Sakti District Headquarters State Highway No. SH16 directly connects Subdivision Malkharoda and Subdivision Dabhra by Chhapora Road. 
The shortest road connecting Korba to Orissa Raigarh, Dabhra, Malkharoda and Sarangarh passes through Sakti City.  Sakti City is a major road junction which connects different city and state.

Industries

 India's largest Trailer and Tipper Manufacturing Plant Vandana Group - Manufacturer of Truck's Tipper, Trailer, Flatbed Trailer, Box Type (Manual) Trailer, Tractor Trolley and Agricultural Implements.
 Sakti known as India's dolomite hub. India's largest dolomite storage area has been achieved in Sakti district, which will start mining here in the coming time.
 The silk fabric here is famous all over Chhattisgarh.
Swastik Metal industry also situated in Sakti.

Education

There are many private and government schools and colleges in Sakti, some of them are:

Schools
 Jindal World School
 Saraswati Shishu Mandir, Sakti (one of the oldest school of Sakti, established in 1957)
 Govt. G.H.M.S. Sakti
 M.L.Jain H.S. School Sakti (First English Medium School of Sakti, established in the 1980s)
 Govt. P.S.Sarwani Sakti

Colleges

 J.L.N College Sakti
 Government Kranti Kumar Bhartiya Collage Jetha Sakti
 Government Atal Bihari Vajpayee College Nagarda Sakti
 Shyam Shiksha Mahavidyalaya Damaudhara Sakti
Jagrani Devi Shikha Mahavidyalaya Baradwar,Sakti
Shri Balaji College of Pharmaceutical Sciences, Damaudhara Sakti
Jagrani Devi degree College Baradwar Sakti
Pt Sunder Lal Sharma Vishwavidyalaya Sakti
Prajapati Brahma Kumari Ishwari Vishwavidyalaya Sakti
C.V. Raman College Sakti

ITI
 Government ITI Sakti
 Jagrani Devi ITI Sakti

References

Dr. Sanjay Alung-Chhattisgarh ki Riyaste/Princely stastes aur Jamindariyaa (Vaibhav Prakashan, Raipur1)
Dr. Sanjay Alung-Chhattisgarh ki Janjaatiyaa/Tribes aur Jatiyaa/Castes (Mansi publication, Delhi6)

Further reading

Cities and towns in Janjgir-Champa district